Slovenia participated in the Eurovision Song Contest 1996 with the song "Dan najlepših sanj", performed by Regina.

Before Eurovision

EMA 1996 
The Slovene national final in 1996 was the first edition that used the title EMA (Evrovizijska Melodija), which has been used in all Slovene selections since. After the list of competing artists were announced, Faraoni withdrew from the competition.

EMA 1996 took place on 10 February 1996 at the RTV Slovenija studios in Ljubljana, hosted by Tajda Lekše. A jury vote from twelve regional radio stations in Slovenia determined the winner.

At Eurovision

Voting

Qualifying round

Final

References

1996
Countries in the Eurovision Song Contest 1996
Eurovision